Golden Beak is a 1928 Soviet drama film directed by Yevgeni Chervyakov. Screen version of the eponymous historical novel by Anna Karavaeva.

One of the last three Soviet silent films that appeared on the screens in 1929, along with the films The New Babylon and Fragment of an Empire.

Plot 
Hundreds of serfs are sent to work at the proud factory "Golden Beak", where they work in extremely difficult conditions. People dreamed of freedom, and their power was cruelly suppressed. Suddenly a group of workers managed to escape. They have been looking for the cherished valley of Bukhtarma for a long time, where, according to legend, there is a promised land. Having reached it, they organized a free peasant state.

Cast 
 A. Yefimov as Stepan
 Gennadiy Michurin as Marey
 Sergei Minin as Sencha
 Mikhail Gipsi as The elder Shushin
 Boris Dmokhovsky as The younger Shushin
  Pyotr Berezov  as Dandy
 Boris Livanov as Major Tuchkov
 Anna Sten as Varenka
  Konstantin Gibshman  as Factory manager  
 Antonina Sadovskaya  as Manager's wife 
  Aleksei Bogdanovsky  as Foreign specialist
 Valeri Plotnikov as Mereykha
  A. Galatova  as Ksyusha
 Leonid Kmit as Peasant

References

External links 
 
 О Евгении Червякове. Режиссёр экзистенциального кино // Iskusstvo Kino

1928 films
Films directed by Yevgeni Chervyakov
1920s Russian-language films
Soviet black-and-white films
Soviet historical drama films
1920s historical drama films
Soviet silent films
Films based on Russian novels
1928 drama films
Silent drama films